The 1986 Benson and Hedges Open was a men's Grand Prix tennis tournament played on outdoor hard courts in Auckland, New Zealand. It was the 19th edition of the tournament and was held from 6 January to 20 January 1986. Unseeded Mark Woodforde won the singles title.

Finals

Singles

 Mark Woodforde defeated  Bud Schultz 6–4, 6–3, 3–6, 6–4
 It was Woodforde's only title of the year and the 1st of his career.

Doubles
 Broderick Dyke /  Wally Masur defeated  Karl Richter /  Rick Rudeen 6–3, 6–4
 It was Dyke's only title of the year and the 4th of his career. It was Masur's 1st title of the year and the 6th of his career.

References

External links
 
 ATP – tournament profile
 ITF – tournament edition details

Heineken Open
Heineken
ATP Auckland Open
January 1986 sports events in New Zealand